The Battle of Valmy, also known as the Cannonade of Valmy, was the first major victory by the army of France during the Revolutionary Wars that followed the French Revolution. The battle took place on 20 September 1792 as Prussian troops commanded by the Duke of Brunswick attempted to march on Paris. Generals François Kellermann and Charles Dumouriez stopped the advance near the northern village of Valmy in Champagne-Ardenne.

In this early part of the Revolutionary Wars—known as the War of the First Coalition—the new French government was in almost every way unproven, and thus the small, localized victory at Valmy became a huge psychological victory for the Revolution at large. The outcome was thoroughly unexpected by contemporary observers—a vindication for the French revolutionaries and a stunning defeat for the vaunted Prussian army. The victory emboldened the newly assembled National Convention to formally declare the end of monarchy in France and to establish the French Republic. Valmy permitted the development of the Revolution and all its resultant ripple effects, and for that it is regarded by historians as one of the most significant battles in history.

Background
As the French Revolution continued, the monarchies of Europe became concerned that revolutionary fervor would spread to their countries.  The War of the First Coalition was an effort to stop the revolution, or at least contain it to France. King Frederick William II of Prussia had the support of Great Britain and the Austrian Empire to send the Duke of Brunswick towards Paris with a large army. In the war's early encounters of mid-1792, French troops did not distinguish themselves, and enemy forces advanced dangerously deep into France intending to pacify the country, restore the traditional monarchy, and end the Revolution. The French commander Charles Dumouriez, meanwhile, had been marching his army northeast to attack the Austrian Netherlands, but this plan was abandoned because of the more immediate threat to Paris. A second army under General François Kellermann was ordered to link up with him in a mutual defense.

Just over half of the French infantry were regulars of the old Royal Army, as were nearly all of the cavalry and, most importantly, the artillery, which were widely regarded as the best in Europe at the time. These veterans provided a professional core to steady the enthusiastic volunteer battalions. Combined, Dumouriez' Army of the North and Kellermann's Army of the Centre totalled approximately 54,000 troops. Heading towards them was Brunswick's coalition army of about 84,000, all veteran Prussian and Austrian troops augmented by large complements of Hessians and the French royalist Army of Condé.

Battle

The invading army handily captured Longwy on 23 August and Verdun on 2 September, then moved on toward Paris through the defiles of the Forest of Argonne. In response, Dumouriez halted his advance to the Netherlands and reversed course, approaching the enemy army from its rear. From Metz, Kellermann moved to his assistance, joining him at the village of Sainte-Menehould on 19 September.
The French forces were now east of the Prussians, behind their lines. Theoretically the Prussians could have marched straight towards Paris unopposed, but this course was never seriously considered: the threat to their lines of supply and communication was too great to be ignored. The unfavorable situation was compounded by bad weather and an alarming increase in sickness among the troops. With few other options available, Brunswick turned back and prepared to do battle.

The troops trudged laboriously through a heavy downpour—"rain as of the days of Noah", in the words of Thomas Carlyle. Brunswick headed through the northern woods believing he could cut off Dumouriez. At the moment when the Prussian manœuvre was nearly completed, Kellermann advanced his left wing and took up a position on the slopes between Sainte-Menehould and Valmy. He centered his command around an old windmill, which he quickly razed to prevent enemy artillery spotters from using it as a sighting location. His veteran artillerists were well-placed upon its accommodating ridge to begin the so-called "Cannonade of Valmy". Brunswick moved toward them with about 34,000 of his troops. As they emerged from the woods, a long-range gunnery duel ensued and the French batteries proved superior. The Prussian infantry made a cautious, and fruitless, effort to advance under fire across the open ground.

As the Prussians wavered, a pivotal moment was reached when Kellermann raised his hat and made his famous cry of "Vive la Nation". The cry was repeated again and again by all the French army, and had a crushing effect upon Prussian morale. The French troops sang "La Marseillaise" and "Ça Ira", and a cheer went up from the French line. To the surprise of nearly everyone, Brunswick broke off the action and retired from the field. The Prussians rounded the French positions at a great distance and commenced a rapid retreat eastward. The two engaged forces had been essentially equal in size, Kellermann with approximately 36,000 troops and 40 cannon, and Brunswick with 34,000 and 54 cannon. Yet by the time Brunswick retreated, casualties had risen no higher than three hundred French and two hundred Prussians.

Prussian retreat
The precipitous end to the action provoked elation among the French. The question of exactly why the Prussians withdrew has never been definitively answered. Most historians ascribe the retreat to some combination of the following factors: the highly defensible French position together with the rapidly growing numbers of reinforcements and citizen volunteers with their discouraging and thoroughly unexpected élan which persuaded the cautious Brunswick to spare himself a dangerous loss of manpower, particularly when the Russian invasion of Poland had already raised concerns for Prussia's defensibility in the east. Others have put forward more shadowy motives for the decision, including a secret plea by Louis XVI to avoid an action which might cost him his life, and even bribery of the Prussians, allegedly paid for with the Bourbon crown jewels. 

An analysis by Dr Munro Price, reader in history at the University of Bradford and a modern specialist in this period, concludes that there is no convincing proof of bribery turning back the Prussians. The more likely explanation remains that, having initially adopted an aggressive strategy, Brunswick lacked the will to carry it through when confronted by an unexpectedly determined and disciplined opposition.  Brunswick had actually been offered command of the French armies prior to the outbreak of war and émigré factions subsequently used this as a basis to allege treachery on his part. In any case, the battle ended decisively, the French pursuit was not seriously pressed, and Brunswick's troops managed a safe if inglorious eastward retreat.

Aftermath

This engagement was the turning point of the Prussians' campaign. Beset with food shortages and dysentery, their retreat continued well past the Rhine River. French troops soon struck forward into Germany, taking Mainz in October. Dumouriez once again moved against the Austrian Netherlands and Kellermann ably secured the front at Metz.

Dumouriez would bear a harsh change of fortune: after one more influential success in November 1792 at Jemappes, he was by the following year a broken man. His army had suffered such catastrophic losses that he defected to the royalist side for the rest of his life. Kellermann, however, continued in a long and distinguished military career. In 1808 he was ennobled by Napoleon and became Duke of Valmy.

Legacy

In terms of military history the battle introduced features that reshaped modern warfare. It exemplified key components of "total war" in terms of political propaganda, psychological warfare, and eager participation of large numbers of politicized civilians. 

After a while the battle came to be celebrated as the first great victory of the armies of the French Revolution. In the varied historiography of the French Revolution, it is typically portrayed as the first victory of a citizen army, inspired by liberty and nationalism. Many thousands of volunteers did indeed swell the ranks, but at least half of the French forces were professional soldiers, particularly among Kellermann's critical artillery units. The French artillery also held a tactical advantage in its modern Gribeauval gun system which proved highly successful on the battlefield. But in popular conception, Valmy was a victory of citizen-soldiers: the battle was emblemized by Kellermann's cry, augmented by the troops'  singing of "La Marseillaise" and the "Ça Ira" while under fire.

On the day of the battle, the Legislative Assembly had duly transferred its power to the National Convention.
Over the next two days, flush with the news from Valmy, the new Convention deputies abolished the monarchy and proclaimed the French Republic. The victory was a much-needed source of pride for the revolutionary French state, and provided enduring inspiration for the years that followed. It was considered by many contemporaries to be a miraculous event for France, and a "decisive defeat" for one of the most effective armies in Europe. Scholars continue to count it among the most significant clashes in military history.

The Prussians themselves recognized the importance of the battle, not merely as a setback in the war but as a crucial advancement for the Revolution as a whole. The German writer and poet Johann Wolfgang von Goethe, who was present at the battle with the Prussian army, later wrote that he was approached by some of his comrades in a state of dejection. He had previously cheered them up with memorable and clever quotes but his only consolation this time was, "Here and today, a new epoch in the history of the world has begun, and you can boast you were present at its birth."

References

Sources
 
 
 
 
 
 
 
 
 
 
 
 

 Meyer, Élise. "Valmy: The victory and its reputation." Annales historiques de la Revolution francaise. No. 4. 2020. abstract
 
 
 
 
 
 Wainwright, E. H. "The cannonade of Valmy." Kleio 5.2 (1973): 62–76.

Further reading
 Forrest, Alan. The Legacy of the French Revolutionary Wars: The Nation-in-Arms in French Republican Memory (Cambridge University Press, 2009)
 Lynn, John A. "Valmy" MHQ: Quarterly Journal of Military History (Fall 1992), 5#1 pp 88–97.
 Scott, Samuel F. From Yorktown to Valmy: the transformation of the French Army in an age of revolution (University Press of Colorado, 1998)
 Thoral, Marie-Cécile. From Valmy to Waterloo: France at War, 1792–1815 (Palgrave Macmillan UK, 2011)

External links
Cannon Thunder at Valmy, David A. Norris, Warfare History Network, 21 March 2019
 HTML version of The Battle of Valmy from Edward Shepherd Creasy's The Fifteen Decisive Battles of the World

Battles involving Prussia
Marne (department)
1792 in France
Conflicts in 1792
Battles of the War of the First Coalition
Battles in Grand Est
Battles inscribed on the Arc de Triomphe